Libresse is a brand of Essity, specializing in products for period and daily intimate care. Libresse is a global brand, operating under a number of different names in local markets – Bodyform, Nana, Nuvenia, Saba, Nosotras, Libresse, and Libra.

Essity (formerly SCA), which is the parent company of Libresse, was founded in Sweden in 1929 by Ivar Kreuger as a paper packaging company. The company is a global hygiene and health company, conducting sales in approximately 150 countries.

Products 
Libresse creates a range of products to support period and daily intimate care, from pads, liners, washes, wipes, menstrual cups and period pants. Their products provide protection across a range of flows, fits and needs.

Marketing
Since 2017, Libresse has made a name for itself with its taboo-busting advertising campaigns on topics surrounding women's bodies and health. The brand often uses creativity to subvert shame and break down stigma, in line with their purpose. Given that these campaigns push boundaries and contain intimate moments, several have caused some controversy at launch.

References 

Feminine hygiene brands